Ricky Little (born 20 May 1989) is a Scottish footballer who plays for Arbroath in the Scottish Championship.

Career
Little began his youth career on the books of the Ayr United youth squad and Ardrossan Winton Rovers, and he captained Scotland schoolboys under-18s in season 2006–07.

When he moved into the senior game, he featured on the subs bench for the Partick Thistle first team several times to cover for injury under Ian McCall.

Little was sent on a month's loan to Queen's Park on 17 September 2008, as he was too old to play for the Firhill side's under 19 side.

Little joined up with Queen's Park again on loan for two months in November 2009. Following his release from the Jags in Jan 2010, he rejoined Queen's Park permanently until the end of the season. He signed a new contract with Queen's Park at the beginning of season 2010–11 and was nominated for PFA Scotland Scottish Third Division Player of the Year at the end of a season that also saw him named club captain.

After spending three years at Queen's Park, in June 2013, Arbroath manager Paul Sheerin signed Little to replace Stuart Malcolm who signed for Forfar Athletic. Shortly after joining the club, he suffered an injury in a Scottish Challenge Cup match against Stenhousemuir, which kept him out for six months.

On 2 May 2015, Little scored from his own half as Arbroath beat Berwick Rangers 5–0. He would go on to become a mainstay of the Arbroath defence, which saw him once again named in the PFA Scotland Team of the Year for Scottish League One in 2015–16. He was also part of the squads that won the 2016–17 Scottish League Two and 2018–19 Scottish League One titles.

Career statistics

Honours

Club
Arbroath
Scottish League Two: 2016–17
Scottish League One: 2018–19

Individual
Scottish League One Player of the Month: November 2018
PFA Scotland Scottish Third Division Team of the Year: 2011–12, 2012–13
PFA Scotland Scottish League Two Team of the Year: 2015–16, 2016–17
PFA Scotland Scottish League One Team of the Year: 2018–19

References

External links

1989 births
Living people
Scottish footballers
Association football defenders
Ayr United F.C. players
Partick Thistle F.C. players
Queen's Park F.C. players
Scottish Football League players
Scottish Junior Football Association players
Ardrossan Winton Rovers F.C. players
Arbroath F.C. players
Scottish Professional Football League players